Guellec is a surname, and may refer to;

(cf. gell)

 Dominique Guellec - French economist
 Ambroise Guellec - French politician and Member of the European Parliament
 Jean-Philippe Leguellec - Canadian biathlete

References

External links
Distribution of the surname Guellec in France

Breton-language surnames